
Gmina Przybiernów is a rural gmina (administrative district) in Goleniów County, West Pomeranian Voivodeship, in north-western Poland.

Villages
Gmina Przybiernów contains the villages and settlements of Babigoszcz, Borowik, Brzozowo, Budzieszewice, Buk, Czarnogłowy, Derkacz, Domanie, Dzieszkowo, Dzisna, Kartlewko, Kartlewo, Leszczno, Łoźnica, Machowica, Miodowice, Moracz, Owczarnia, Przybiernów, Rokita, Rzystnowo, Sobieszewo, Sosnowice, Świętoszewko, Świętoszewo, Trzebianowo, Włodzisław, Zabierzewo and Żychlikowo.

Neighbouring gminas
Gmina Przybiernów is bordered by the gminas of Golczewo, Goleniów, Nowogard, Osina, Stepnica and Wolin.

References
Polish official population figures 2006

Przybiernow
Goleniów County